Rouben V. Ambartzumian (born 1941) is an Armenian mathematician and Academician of National Academy of Sciences of Armenia. He works in Stochastic Geometry and Integral Geometry where he created a new branch, combinatorial integral geometry. The subject of combinatorial integral geometry received support from mathematicians K. Krickeberg and D. G. Kendall at the 1976 Sevan Symposium (Armenia) which was sponsored by Royal Society of London and The London Mathematical Society. In the framework of the later theory he solved a number of classical problems in particular the solution to the Buffon Sylvester problem as well as the Hilbert's fourth problem in 1976. He is a holder of the Rollo Davidson Prize of Cambridge University of 1982. Rouben's interest in Integral Geometry was inherited from his father. Nobel prize winner Allan McLeod Cormack Laureate for Tomography wrote: "Ambartsumian gave the first numerical inversion of the Radon transform and it gives the lie to the often made statement that computed tomography would have been impossible without computers". Victor Hambardzumyan, in his book "A Life in Astrophysics", wrote about the work of Rouben V. Ambartzumian, "More recently, it came to my knowledge that the invariance principle or invariant embedding was applied in a purely mathematical field of integral geometry where it gave birth to a novel, combinatorial branch." See R. V. Ambartzumian, «Combinatorial Integral Geometry», John Wiley, 1982.

Experience 
 1968 – present, Head of department, Institute of Mathematics, National Academy of Sciences of Armenia
 1990 – 2010 Chief Editor of the Izvestia NAN RA Matematika (in Russian)
 1990 – 2010 Translation Editor of Journal of Contemporary Mathematical Analysis, Allerton Press, Inc. New York (the English Translation of Izvestia NAS RA Matematika)
 2009 -2013 Director of the FREEZWATER project, Yerevan, Armenia

Education, scientific degrees
1986              Academician of National Academy of Sciences of Armenia
1975	        Soviet Doctor of Mathematics and Physics, from Steklov Mathematical Institute, Moscow
1968 	        Soviet Kandidat of Mathematics and Physics , from Steklov Mathematical	Institute, Moscow
1959–1964	Moscow State University diploma, Mathematician.

Books
1982 – R.V. Ambartzumian "Combinatorial Integral Geometry with Applications to Mathematical Stereology, John Wiley, Chichester, NY

The book was positively reviewed in many journals. In particular Ralph Alexander wrote in the Bulletin (New Series) of the American Math Society the following
"Ambartzumian established a base camp in a little explored area of geometry. From here a number of interesting problems can be seen from a new perspective. With luck a boom town could arise. At the very least this work is a significant contribution to the foundations of integral geometry".

1989 – R.V. Ambartzumian, D.Stoyan, J.Mecke “Introduction to Stochastic Geometry”, Nauka, Moscow (in Russian)
1990 – R.V. Ambartzumian  “Factorization Calculus and Geometric Probability, Encyclopedia of Mathematics and Its Applications 33, Cambridge University Press, Cambridge
1989 – R.V. Ambartzumian, J.Mecke, D.Stoyan “Geometrische Wahrscheinlichkeiten und Stochastische Geometrie” Akademie Verlag, Berlin
2015 – R.V. Ambartzumian “WILSONIAN ARMENIA: stories behind the failed project”

Collections of papers,  Editor
“Combinatorial Principles in Stochastic Geometry” (in Russian) NASRA Publishing House, Yerevan 1980 
The paper contains a review of the main results of Yerevan research group in planar stochastic geometry, in particular the second order random geometrical processes using the methods of integration of combinatorial decompositions and invariant imbedding.
“Stochastic Geometry, Geometric Statistics, Stereology” (Proceedings of the Conference held at Oberwolfach, 1983). Teubner - Texte zur Mathematik, Band 65, Leipzig 1983
“Stochastic and Integral Geometry”,  (Proceedings of the Second Sevan Symposium on Integral and Stochastic Geometry), in Acta Applicandae Mathematicae, Vol 9, Nos 1-2 (1987)

Organizer of International Conferences
1978 – I Sevan Symposium on Integral Geometry “200 anniversary of Buffon problem”, Sevan, Armenia. Sponsorship from the Royal Society of London
1983 – Conference on Stochastic Geometry, Geometric Statistics and Stereology, Oberwolfach (Germany)
1985 – II Sevan Symposium on Integral and Stochastic Geometry, Sevan, Armenia 
1991- Conference on Stochastic Geometry, Oberwolfach (Germany)
2013- Swiss –Armenian Round Table

References
 
 
 
 Ambartzumian, R. V., Wicksell problem for planar particles of random shape http://www.math.uni-magdeburg.de/stoch2002/abstracts/s6-ambartzumian.pdf
 
 Ambartzumian, R. V, Wilsonain Armenia: stories behind the failed project https://www.lap-publishing.com/catalog/details/store/de/book/978-3-659-75300-8/wilsonian-armenia:-stories-behind-the-failed-project?search=wilsonian%20armeina
 Mathematician Rouben Ambartzumian celebrates his diamond jubilee today http://www.lragir.am/index/eng/0/society/rss/36468
 https://link.springer.com/article/10.3103%2FS1068362307010013?LI=true
 Palm distributions and random colorings of the plane http://www.mathnet.ru/php/presentation.phtml?option_lang=eng&presentid=250
 Ambartzumian, R.V. J. Contemp. Mathemat. Anal. (2009) 44: 25. https://doi.org/10.3103/S1068362309010063
 Ambartzumian, R.V. J. Contemp. Mathemat. Anal. (2007) 42: 3. https://doi.org/10.3103/S1068362307010013
 Ambartzumian, R.V. J. Contemp. Mathemat. Anal. (2008) 43: 3. https://doi.org/10.3103/s11957-008-1002-0
 Амбарцумян, Р. В. (1999) Аналитические результаты комбинаторной интегральной геометрии : Обзор. Հայաստանի ԳԱԱ Տեղեկագիր. Մաթեմատիկա, 34 (6). pp. 7–51.  http://mathematics.asj-oa.am/id/eprint/580
 Ambartzumian, R. V. (2013) Parallel X-ray tomography of convex domains as a search problem in two dimensions. Հայաստանի ԳԱԱ Տեղեկագիր. Մաթեմատիկա, 48 (1). pp. 37–52.  http://mathematics.asj-oa.am/id/eprint/2334
 https://books.google.com/books?id=DYIfNZ_RRS4C&lpg=PR9&ots=Cqa2hGKqXf&dq=%22%D1%80%20%D0%B2%20%D0%B0%D0%BC%D0%B1%D0%B0%D1%80%D1%86%D1%83%D0%BC%D1%8F%D0%BD%22%20OR%20%22r%20v%20ambartzumian%22&lr&pg=PR9#v=onepage&q=%22%D1%80%20%D0%B2%20%D0%B0%D0%BC%D0%B1%D0%B0%D1%80%D1%86%D1%83%D0%BC%D1%8F%D0%BD%22%20OR%20%22r%20v%20ambartzumian%22&f=false
 A. A. Krasnovsky Jr., N. N. Drozdova, Ya. V. Roumbal, A. V. Ivanov, and R. V. Ambartzumian, "Biophotonics of molecular oxygen: activation efficiencies upon direct and photosensitized excitation," Chin. Opt. Lett. 3, S1-S4 (2005) http://col.osa.org/abstract.cfm?URI=col-3-101-S1
 Chemical Physics Letters Volume 400, Issues 4–6, 21 December 2004,A. A. Krasnovsky Jr. R. V. Ambartzumian Pages 531-535 https://doi.org/10.1016/j.cplett.2004.11.009
 
 Ambartzumian, R. V. (2013) Sevan methodologies revisited: Random line processes. Հայաստանի ԳԱԱ Տեղեկագիր. Մաթեմատիկա, 48 (1). pp. 9–36. ISSN  http://mathematics.asj-oa.am/id/eprint/2333

1941 births
Living people
20th-century Armenian mathematicians
Armenian people of Russian descent
21st-century Armenian mathematicians